Fernsehturm is the German word for television tower. A number of German cities have television towers and each will usually be referred to simply as "Fernsehturm" by the inhabitants of the city. 
The correct term for the tower as a Building although would be "Fernmeldeturm" which depicts the original purpose of most of these towers; relaying any type of communication, not only television.

It may refer to any of the following structures:

 Fernsehturm Berlin
 Fernsehturm Schwerin-Zippendorf
 Fernsehturm Dresden-Wachwitz
 Fernsehturm Stuttgart 
 Fernmeldeturm Mannheim
 Florianturm (Dortmund)
 Fernmeldeturm Münster
 Fernsehturm Heidelberg
 Heinrich Hertz Tower (Hamburg)